Fano tesemara ('O Guerrilla, rise to arms') is an Ethiopian song. It was one of the most popular protest songs of the Ethiopian Student Movement during the late 1960s. The song was inspired by the Cuban and Vietnamese revolutions, as manifested in its opening lines:

References

Ethiopian songs
Protest songs
Ho Chi Minh
Works about Che Guevara
Cultural depictions of Che Guevara
Songs about revolutions
Songs about revolutionaries